Xingquan is a town in Huaping County, Yunnan, China.

Administrative division 
As of 2016, the town is divided into nine villages: 
 Xingquan
 Xinwen
 Ganjing
 Nanyang
 Wenle
 Songzhu
 Qinglong
 Tangfang
 Guantang

History 
The town was known as "Fuquan" in the Republic of China.

After the founding of the People's Republic of China, in 1950, it was called "Daxing District". In 1958, it was renamed "Daxing People's Commune". The town reverted to its former name of "Daxing District" in 1984. In 1988, it split into Daxing Township and Wenle Lisu Ethnic Township. In 2002, it was upgraded to a town. On 6 January 2006, the two townships merged to form the town of Xingquan.

Geography 
The town is situated in the northeastern Huaping County, bordering Zhongxin and Chuanfang Lisu Ethnic Township to the west, Shilongba to the south,  of Yanbian County to the north, and Geliping of Xi District to the east.

The Daxing River, Longdong River and Nanyang River flow through the town.

Xinwen Reservoir is a reservoir located in the town.

Economy 
Agriculture, mineral resources and building material are the major industries. Peaches, vegetables and tobacco are the economic plants of this region. The region abounds with coal, limestone, graphite, and clay.

Demographics 

As of 2017, the National Bureau of Statistics of China estimates the town's population now to be 18,516. The main ethnic groups in the town are Yi, Zhuang, Dai, Miao, Lisu, Hui and Nakhi.

Tourist attractions 
The Suolong Bridge is a popular attraction in the town.

Transportation 
The town is connected to two highways: the China National Highway 353 and the G4216 Expressway.

References

Bibliography 

Divisions of Huaping County